Bullia is a genus of sea snails, marine gastropod mollusks in the family Nassariidae, the Nassa mud snails or dog whelks.

Species
The following subgenera are recognized:
 Bullia (Bullia) Gray, 1834
 Bullia (Cereobullia) Melvill & Peile, 1924

Species within the genus Bullia include:

 Bullia aikeni Kilburn, 1978
 Bullia ancillaeformis Smith, 1906
 Bullia annulata (Lamarck, 1816) 
 † Bullia bantamensis Oostingh, 1933 
 Bullia callosa (W. Wood, 1828) 
 Bullia cataphracta Kilburn, 1978
 Bullia ceroplasta Melvill, 1898
 Bullia chitanii Yokoyama, 1926 †
 Bullia crosseana Tapparone-Canefri, 1882 (nomen dubium)
 Bullia cumingiana Dunker, 1852
 Bullia digitalis (Dillwyn, 1817) 
 Bullia diluta (Krauss, 1848) 
 Bullia elegans Dunker, 1857 (nomen dubium)
 Bullia granulosa (Lamarck, 1822) - synonym: Bullia fusca Craven
 Bullia gruveli (Dautzenberg, 1910)
 Bullia indusindica Melvill, 1898
 Bullia insignis Turton, 1932 (nomen dubium)
 Bullia jucunda Turton, 1932
 Bullia kurrachensis Angas, 1877
 Bullia laevissima (Gmelin, 1791) 
 † Bullia litoralis Oostingh, 1933
 Bullia livida Reeve, 1846
 Bullia martinii Gray, 1843 (nomen dubium)
 Bullia mauritiana Gray, 1839
 Bullia melanoides (Deshayes, 1832)
 Bullia mirepicta Bozzetti, 2007
 Bullia mozambicensis Smith, 1878 
 Bullia natalensis (Krauss, 1848).
 Bullia nitida Sowerby, 1895
 Bullia nuttalli Kilburn, 1978
 Bullia osculata Sowerby III, 1900
 Bullia osseum Menke, 1829  (nomen dubium)
 Bullia othaeitensis (Bruguière, 1789)
 Bullia perlucida Bozzetti, 2014
 Bullia perryi Jay, 1855  (nomen dubium)
 Bullia persica Smith, 1878
 † Bullia provecta Beets, 1942 
 Bullia pulchella Turton, 1932  (nomen dubium)
 Bullia pura Melvill, 1885 
 Bullia rhodostoma Reeve, 1847 
 Bullia rogersi Smythe & Chatfield, 1981
 Bullia semiplicata Gray, 1833
 Bullia sendersi Kilburn, 1978
 Bullia similis Sowerby, 1897
 Bullia skoogi (Odhner, 1923)
 Bullia smytheae Moolenbeek & Dekker, 1994
 † Bullia sundaica Oostingh, 1939
 Bullia tamsiana Dunker, 1853
 Bullia tenuis Reeve, 1846
 Bullia terebraeformis Dautzenberg
 Bullia townsendi Melvill, 1912
 Bullia tranquebarica (Röding, 1798)
 Bullia trifasciata Smith, 1904
 Bullia truncata Reeve, 1846
 Bullia turrita Gray, 1839
 Bullia vittata (Linnaeus, 1767)

Synonyms:
 Bullia belangeri Kiener: synonym of Bullia tranquebarica (Röding, 1798)
 Bullia cinerea Preston, 1906: synonym of Nassarius dorsatus (Röding, 1798)
 Bullia fuscus Gray in Dieffenbach, 1834 is a synonym of Impages hectica (Linnaeus, 1758)
 Bullia miran (Bruguière, 1789) is a synonym of Dorsanum miran (Bruguière, 1789)
 Bullia truncata Reeve, 1846: synonym of Adinus truncatus (Reeve, 1846) 
 Bullia valida Dunker, 1852 is a synonym of Pusionella valida (Dunker, 1852)

References

Further reading
 Odhner, N.H. (1923) Contribution to the marine molluscan faunas of South and West Africa. Meddelanden fran Göteborgs Musei Zoologiska Avdelning, 23, 1–39, 1 pl. page(s): 15
 Abbott, R.T. & S.P. Dance (1986). Compendium of sea shells. American Malacologists, Inc:Melbourne, Florida
 Allmon W. D. (1990). "Review of the Bullia group (Gastropoda: Nassariidae) with comments on its evolution, biogeography, and phylogeny". Bulletins of American Paleontology 99(335): 179 pp., 15 pls.

External links

Nassariidae
Taxa named by Edward Griffith (zoologist)
Gastropod genera